Felix Bloch (23 October 1905 – 10 September 1983) was a Swiss-American physicist and Nobel physics laureate who worked mainly in the U.S. He and Edward Mills Purcell were awarded the 1952 Nobel Prize for Physics for "their development of new ways  and methods for nuclear magnetic precision measurements."  In 1954–1955, he served for one year as the first Director-General of CERN. Felix Bloch made fundamental theoretical contributions to the understanding of ferromagnetism and electron behavior in crystal lattices. He is also considered one of the developers of nuclear magnetic resonance.

Biography

Early life, education, and family
Bloch was born in Zürich, Switzerland to Jewish parents Gustav and Agnes Bloch. Gustav Bloch, his father, was financially unable to attend University and worked as a wholesale grain dealer in Zürich. Gustav moved to Zürich in 1890 to become a Swiss citizen. Their first child was a girl born in 1902 while Felix was born three years later.

Bloch entered public elementary school at the age of six and is said to have been teased, in part because he "spoke Swiss German with a somewhat different accent than most members of the class". He received support from his older sister during much of this time, but she died at the age of twelve, devastating Felix, who is said to have lived a "depressed and isolated life" in the following years. Bloch learned to play the piano by the age of eight and was drawn to arithmetic for its "clarity and beauty". Bloch graduated from elementary school at twelve and enrolled in the Cantonal Gymnasium in Zürich for secondary school in 1918. He was placed on a six-year curriculum here to prepare him for University. He continued his curriculum through 1924, even through his study of engineering and physics in other schools, though it was limited to mathematics and languages after the first three years. After these first three years at the Gymnasium, at age fifteen Bloch began to study at the Eidgenössische Technische Hochschule (ETHZ), also in Zürich. Although he initially studied engineering he soon changed to physics. During this time he attended lectures and seminars given by Peter Debye and Hermann Weyl at ETH Zürich and Erwin Schrödinger at the neighboring University of Zürich. A fellow student in these seminars was John von Neumann. 

Bloch graduated in 1927, and was encouraged by Debye to go to Leipzig to study with Werner Heisenberg. Bloch became Heisenberg's first graduate student, and gained his doctorate in 1928. His doctoral thesis established the quantum theory of solids, using waves to describe electrons in periodic lattices.

On March 14, 1940, Bloch married Lore Clara Misch (1911–1996), a fellow physicist working on X-ray crystallography, whom he had met at an American Physical Society meeting. They had four children, twins George Jacob Bloch and Daniel Arthur Bloch (born January 15, 1941), son Frank Samuel Bloch (born January 16, 1945), and daughter Ruth Hedy Bloch Alexander (born September 15, 1949).

Career
Bloch remained in European academia, working on superconductivity with Wolfgang Pauli in Zürich; with Hans Kramers and Adriaan Fokker in Holland; with Heisenberg on ferromagnetism, where he developed a description of boundaries between magnetic domains, now known as "Bloch walls", and theoretically proposed a concept of spin waves, excitations of magnetic structure; with Niels Bohr in Copenhagen, where he worked on a theoretical description of the stopping of charged particles traveling through matter; and with Enrico Fermi in Rome. In 1932, Bloch returned to Leipzig to assume a position as "Privatdozent" (lecturer). In 1933, immediately after Hitler came to power, he left Germany because he was Jewish, returning to Zürich, before traveling to Paris to lecture at the Institut Henri Poincaré.

In 1934, the chairman of Stanford Physics invited Bloch to join the faculty. Bloch accepted the offer and emigrated to the United States. In the fall of 1938, Bloch began working with the 37 inch cyclotron at the University of California, Berkeley to determine the magnetic moment of the neutron. Bloch went on to become the first professor for theoretical physics at Stanford. In 1939, he became a naturalized citizen of the United States.

During WWII, Bloch briefly worked on the atomic bomb project at Los Alamos. Disliking the military atmosphere of the laboratory and uninterested in the theoretical work there, Bloch left to join the radar project at Harvard University.

After the war, he concentrated on investigations into nuclear induction and nuclear magnetic resonance, which are the underlying principles of MRI.  In 1946 he proposed the Bloch equations which determine the time evolution of nuclear magnetization. He was elected to the United States National Academy of Sciences in 1948. Along with Edward Purcell, Bloch was awarded the 1952 Nobel Prize in Physics for his work on nuclear magnetic induction.

When CERN was being set up in the early 1950s, its founders were searching for someone of stature and international prestige to head the fledgling international laboratory, and in 1954 Professor Bloch became CERN's first Director-General, at the time when construction was getting under way on the present Meyrin site and plans for the first machines were being drawn up. After leaving CERN, he returned to Stanford University, where he in 1961 was made Max Stein Professor of Physics.

In 1964, he was elected a foreign member of the Royal Netherlands Academy of Arts and Sciences. He was also a member of the American Academy of Arts and Sciences and the American Philosophical Society.

Bloch died in Zürich in 1983.

See also
 List of Jewish Nobel laureates
List of things named after Felix Bloch

Footnotes

References

Further reading
Bloch, F.; Staub, H. "Fission Spectrum", Los Alamos National Laboratory (LANL) (through predecessor agency Los Alamos Scientific Lab), United States Department of Energy (through predecessor agency the US Atomic Energy Commission), (August 18, 1943).

External links

 
 Oral History interview transcript with Felix Bloch on 14 May 1964, American Institute of Physics, Niels Bohr Library and Archives - interview conducted by Thomas S. Kuhn in Palo Alto, California
 Oral History interview transcript with Felix Bloch on 15 August 1968, American Institute of Physics, Niels Bohr Library and Archives - interview conducted by Charles Weiner at Stanford University
 Oral History interview transcript with Felix Bloch 15 December 1981, American Institute of Physics, Niels Bohr Library and Archives - interview conducted by Lillian Hoddeson at Stanford University
 Felix Bloch Papers, 1931–1987 (33 linear ft.) are housed in the Department of Special Collections and University Archives at Stanford University Libraries
National Academy of Sciences Biographical Memoir
 Felix Bloch Papers

1905 births
1983 deaths
Nobel laureates in Physics
Swiss Nobel laureates
American Nobel laureates
20th-century American physicists
American people of Swiss-Jewish descent
Naturalized citizens of the United States
People associated with CERN
ETH Zurich alumni
Experimental physicists
Harvard University people
Jewish American scientists
Jewish physicists
Leipzig University alumni
Manhattan Project people
Members of the Royal Netherlands Academy of Arts and Sciences
Members of the United States National Academy of Sciences
Fellows of the American Physical Society
Recipients of the Pour le Mérite (civil class)
Stanford University Department of Physics faculty
Swiss Jews
Swiss physicists
Swiss emigrants to the United States
Nuclear magnetic resonance
Scientists from Zürich
Members of the American Philosophical Society
Presidents of the American Physical Society